Delta Sigma Lambda was a social fraternity founded on September 9, 1921, formed entirely of members of the Order of DeMolay. It continued for about fifteen years, numbering 12 chapters in its rolls, with several closing in the early years of the Great Depression. Delta Sigma Lambda's remaining chapters either disbanded or were absorbed by other fraternities by 1937.

History
The origin of Delta Sigma Lambda can be traced to the spontaneous rise of a number of local collegiate organizations based on the principles of the Order of DeMolay, a Masonic organization for boys, during 1921–1924. On  six of these fraternities met in Lawrence, Kansas to consider the formation of a National fraternity based on these principles.

Those represented were:
Delta Sigma Lambda: University of California
Delta Sigma Lambda: University of Arizona
Star and Crescent: Purdue University
Scimitar Fraternity: University of Kansas
Delta Kappa Fraternity and Illinois DeMolay Club: University of Illinois
Delta Lambda: University of Nebraska
Other chapters were invited to attend, but were unable. By December 25, the consolidation was finalized, taking the name and founding date from Delta Sigma Lambda, the oldest group.

In 1927 Delta Sigma Lambda would become a junior member of the National Interfraternity Conference.

Expansion
Delta Sigma Lambda would eventually install twelve chapters, two by way of merger with a small national fraternity, but most by adoption of local chapters around the United States. This process halted by 1931.

Theta Alpha merger
The reduction of student enrollment and tightened budgets during the depths of the Great Depression hit all fraternities hard. Earlier that year three of Theta Alpha's five chapters had gone dormant. The surviving chapters at Syracuse and Cornell accepted a merger, with Syracuse being the stronger organization of the two. By the time of the merger, Theta Alpha had initiated 585 members. Theta Alpha fraternity published a periodical called Theta Alpha.

Later that year the Grand Council of the Order of DeMolay recognized Delta Sigma Lambda as "the national college Fraternity for DeMolays", but Baird's 20th notes that this "may have easily proved a handicap".

Chapters of Theta Alpha
The chapter list of Theta Alpha at the time of the  merger were as follows.  Chapters listed in bold merged; chapters that were dormant by that time are in italics.

Contraction continues
This infusion was not enough to save the Fraternity, grappling with the depths of the Great Depression.  Over the next four years, by 1937, many of the chapters had died. Theta Chi in 1937 agreed to absorb the chapters at Purdue University and the University of Montana, and later, the University of Arizona, along with fraternity alumni.  Scattered alumni and some of Delta Sigma Lambda's chapters either withdrew to join other national fraternities or went local.

Symbols
Badge: Jeweled Shield containing the letters  at the top, a star and crescent in the center and below, the Greek letters .

The Fraternity flower was the Trillium.  The Fraternity's colors were Blue and Gold.

Chapter List
Chapters are listed in the order in which they were installed. Chapters listed in bold either merged or withdrew; chapters that were dormant by that time are in italics. Half of the surviving chapters joined Theta Chi, three others either immediately or with a local stop, went to other national fraternities.

References

Defunct former members of the North American Interfraternity Conference
Student organizations established in 1921
1921 establishments in California
1924 establishments in Kansas
1937 disestablishments in the United States